This is a list of Sri Lankan cabinets, in the sense of successive governments, since 1947 before independence until the present.

Background

The Executive Council of Ceylon was the Executive Council created in British Ceylon by the British colonial administration on the recommendations of the Colebrooke-Cameron Commission along with the Legislative Council of Ceylon on March 13, 1833.

At its creation the Executive Council was headed by the Governor, along with five members appointed by the Governor. These five members were officials who held the posts of the Colonial Secretary, the Attorney General, the Auditor-General, the Treasurer and the General Officer Commanding, Ceylon. The Council exercised executive power and advised the governor. As a result of the First Manning Reforms three non-officials were elected to the executive council.

With enactment of the new constitution of the Dominion of Ceylon in 1947 the Executive Council was replaced by a National Cabinet.

Cabinets

See also

 Cabinet of Sri Lanka
 List of Sri Lankan governments

References

 
Cabinets